The African Southern Region Athletics Championships is a biennial international outdoor track and field competition between Southern African nations, organised by the Confederation of African Athletics (CAA). Typically held over two days in June or July, it was established in 1995 and replaced the African Zone VI Championships. It is one of four regional championships organised by the CAA, alongside the North, East and West African Athletics Championships. 

The competition is one of three senior athletics championships organised for the region, alongside the African Southern Region Cross Country Championships (held same year as the track and field meet) and the African Southern Region Half Marathon Championships (held annually). There is also an age category counterpart to the competition, in the form of the African Southern Region U18/U20 Athletics Championships, which is held in even-numbered years, and the Cossasa Games – an athletics competition for Southern African students organised by the Confederation of School Sport Associations of Southern Africa.

The competition is used as preparation by athletes who have been selected for the World Championships in Athletics, which takes place one to two months after the regional championships. Each edition of the championships attracts around a dozen countries and around 600 athletes in total.

The 2019 event was due to be hosted in Johannesburg, South Africa, but Athletics South Africa cancelled the event due to financial issues stemming from the legal case against the IAAF's testosterone rules.

Editions

Events
The competition programme features 32 regular athletics events: seven track running events, two obstacle events, three jumps, and four throws for both the sexes.

Track running
100 metres, 200 metres, 400 metres, 800 metres, 1500 metres, 5000 metres, 10,000 metres
Obstacle events
100 metres hurdles (women only), 110 metres hurdles (men only), 400 metres hurdles, 
Jumping events
High jump, long jump, triple jump
Throwing events
Shot put, discus throw, javelin throw, hammer throw

3000 metres steeplechase, pole vault, and women's distance events are held irregularly due to a lack of entrants and organisational barriers.

Participation

Men's champions

100 metres
1995: 
1997: 
1999: 
2000: 
2001: 
2003: 
2005:

200 metres
1995: 
1997: 
1999: 
2000: 
2001: 
2003: 
2005:

400 metres
1995: 
1997: 
1999: 
2000: 
2001: 
2003: 
2005:

800 metres
1995: 
1997: 
1999: 
2000: 
2001: 
2003: 
2005:

1500 metres
1995: 
1997: 
1999: 
2000: Unknown
2001: 
2003: 
2005:

5000 metres
1995: 
1997: 
1999: 
2000: 
2001: 
2003: 
2005:

10,000 metres
1995: 
1997: 
1999: 
2000: Not held
2001: 
2003: 
2005:

3000 metres steeplechase
1995: 
1997:

110 metres hurdles
1995: 
1997: 
1999: 
2000: 
2001: Not held
2003: 
2005:

400 metres hurdles
1995: 
1997: 
1999: 
2000: 
2001: 
2003: 
2005:

High jump
1995: 
1997: 
1999: 
2000: 
2001: 
2003: 
2005:

Pole vault
1995: 
1997: Not held
1999: 
2000:

Long jump
1995: 
1997: 
1999: 
2000: 
2001: 
2003: 
2005:

Triple jump
1995: 
1997: 
1999: 
2000: 
2001: 
2003: 
2005:

Shot put
1995: 
1997: 
1999: 
2000: 
2001: 
2003: 
2005:

Discus throw
1995: 
1997: 
1999: 
2000: 
2001: 
2003: 
2005:

Hammer throw
1995: 
1997: 
1999: 
2000: Not held
2001:

Javelin throw
1995: 
1997: 
1999: 
2000: 
2001: 
2003: 
2005:

4 × 100 metres relay
1995: Zimbabwe
1997: South Africa
1999: Botswana
2000: Mauritius
2001: Zimbabwe
2003: Zimbabwe
2005: Mauritius

4 × 400 metres relay
1995: Botswana
1997: South Africa
1999: Botswana
2000: Zimbabwe
2001: Botswana
2003: Zimbabwe
2005: Botswana

Women's champions

100 metres
1995: 
1997: 
1999: 
2000: 
2001: 
2003: 
2005:

200 metres
1995: 
1997: 
1999: 
2000: 
2001: 
2003: 
2005:

400 metres
1995: 
1997: 
1999: 
2000: 
2001: 
2003: 
2005:

800 metres
1995: 
1997: 
1999: 
2000: 
2001: 
2003: 
2005:

1500 metres
1995: 
1997: 
1999: 
2000: 
2001: 
2003: 
2005:

5000 metres
1995: 
1997: 
1999: 
2000: 
2001: 
2003: 
2005:

10,000 metres
1995: 
1997: Not held
1999: 
2000: Not held
2001: 
2003: 
2005:

100 metres hurdles
1995: 
1997: 
1999: 
2000: 
2001: Not held
2003: Not held
2005:

400 metres hurdles
1995: Not held
1997: 
1999: 
2000: 
2001: Not held
2003: Not held
2005:

High jump
1995: 
1997: 
1999: 
2000: 
2001: Not held
2003: 
2005:

Pole vault
2000:

Long jump
1995: 
1997: 
1999: 
2000: 
2001: 
2003: 
2005:

Triple jump
1995: 
1997: 
1999: 
2000: Not held
2001: 
2003: 
2005:

Shot put
1995: Not held
1997: 
1999: 
2000: 
2001: 
2003: 
2005:

Discus throw
1995: 
1997: 
1999: 
2000: 
2001: 
2003: 
2005:

Javelin throw
1995: 
1997: 
1999: 
2000: 
2001: 
2003: 
2005:

4 × 100 metres relay
1995: Zimbabwe
1997: South Africa
1999: Zimbabwe
2000: Mashonaland East, Zimbabwe
2001: Zimbabwe
2003: Zambia
2005: Zimbabwe

4 × 400 metres relay
1995: Zimbabwe
1997: South Africa
1999: South Africa
2000: Zambia
2001: Zimbabwe
2003: Zambia
2005: Zambia

References

Champions
African Southern Region Championships. GBR Athletics. Retrieved 2021-01-21.

Confederation of African Athletics competitions
Sport in Southern Africa
Recurring sporting events established in 1995
Biennial athletics competitions